Saint-Léandre is a parish municipality in the Canadian province of Quebec, located in La Matanie Regional County Municipality.

Demographics 

Census data before 2001:
 Population in 1996: 401 (+1.3% from 1991)
 Population in 1991: 396

See also
 List of parish municipalities in Quebec

References

Parish municipalities in Quebec
Incorporated places in Bas-Saint-Laurent